is a railway station in Bizen, Okayama Prefecture, Japan.

It is a single line train station and is unmanned. Facilities at the train station include a small car park, public phone and toilets.

Sōgo Station is the final train station in Okayama Prefecture on the way to Hyōgo Prefecture. Sōgo literally means 'cold river'.

Lines
West Japan Railway Company
Akō Line

Adjacent stations

|-
!colspan=5|JR West

Railway stations in Okayama Prefecture
Railway stations in Japan opened in 1962